Dharmadevi is a municipality in Sankhuwasabha District of Province No. 1 in Nepal. It is a municipality out of 5 municipalities in Sankhuwasabha District. The municipality was established in March 2017 merging some former VDCs: e.g. Aankhibhui, Mamling and Tamaphok. The municipality is divided into 9 wards. The headquarter of the municipality is in Tamaphok.

References

External links
 www.dharmadevimun.gov.np

Populated places in Sankhuwasabha District
Municipalities in Koshi Province
Nepal municipalities established in 2017
Municipalities in Sankhuwasabha District